Wallace S. Wright II (born February 1, 1984) is a former American football wide receiver who played in the National Football League. He was signed by the New York Jets as an undrafted free agent in 2006. He played college football at North Carolina.

He was also a member of the Carolina Panthers and Tampa Bay Buccaneers.

Professional career
Wright left the Jets organization to join the Panthers on March 8, 2010. Wright was released by the Panthers on September 3, 2011 during the final roster cuts prior to the start of the season.

References

External links
Carolina Panther bio

1984 births
Living people
Sportspeople from Fayetteville, North Carolina
Players of American football from North Carolina
African-American players of American football
American football wide receivers
North Carolina Tar Heels football players
New York Jets players
21st-century African-American sportspeople
20th-century African-American people